Ladies' single skating was contested during the figure skating events at the 2006 Winter Olympics.

This individual event was structured in a similar manner to the pairs event, with a short program and a free skating. 30 skaters entered the short program, but only the top 24 competitors continued to the free skating. Unlike the men's event, the free skating is only 4 minutes long. The short program was held on February 21 and the free skating on February 23.

The leading contender heading into the Olympics was 2005 World champion Russia's Irina Slutskaya, the first woman to win the European Championship seven times. Prior to the Olympic Games, she had only been beaten once this season, by Japan's Mao Asada, who was too young to compete at these Olympics.

Favorite Michelle Kwan, who had previously won silver at the 1998 Winter Olympics and bronze at the 2002 Winter Olympics, was forced to withdraw due to a groin injury. As a 5-time world champion and 9-time U.S. champion, the Olympic gold was the only major title missing from her resume. U.S. national bronze medalist Emily Hughes (the younger sister of the last Olympic champion Sarah Hughes) took her place on the American team, joining two-time world silver medalist and U.S. national champion Sasha Cohen and U.S. national silver medalist Kimmie Meissner, the second American woman to land the triple Axel in competition.

Japan also sent a very strong ladies contingent to Turin with 2004 world champion Shizuka Arakawa, two-time world bronze medalist Fumie Suguri and two-time Japanese national champion Miki Ando. Other potential medal contenders included Russia's Elena Sokolova, who won world silver in 2003; two-time Canadian champion Joannie Rochette; 2005 world bronze medalist Carolina Kostner; 2005 European silver medalist Susanna Pöykiö; five-time Swiss champion Sarah Meier; 2005 European bronze medalist Elena Liashenko; and 2004 European champion Júlia Sebestyén.

Arakawa made history by winning Japan's first ever ladies' figure skating gold in the Winter Olympics and the only medal for Japan at the 2006 Winter Olympics.

Short program
Skating last in the short, Cohen wowed the crowd and the judges with a flawless program. Completing her three jump elements and having the best spins and spirals of the night, Cohen came in first place. Slutskaya, beating Cohen technically but not artistically, finished behind Cohen by just 0.03 points. Arakawa also had a clean skate, finished behind Slutskaya by only 0.70 points. With the top three being so close, the winner of the free would likely win the gold.

Suguri had a strong skate but a lack of level 4 spins and spirals kept her out of the top three. Meissner, the second skater in the short and finishing fifth in the short, skated cleanly in her first major international event with a triple Lutz - triple toe combination, one of the few landed in the competition. The surprise in the top six was Georgia's Elene Gedevanishvili, who performed a triple flip - triple toe combination.

Besides a slight stumble in her serpentine steps, Hughes also had a strong debut at her first major international event, finishing seventh in the short. Her sister Sarah was in the stands cheering her on. Rounding out the top ten was Ando, stepping out of her combination; Rochette, putting her hand down on the triple flip; and Sarah Meier, who skated a clean program. Kostner fell on her triple flip combination and finished just out of the top ten but had strong program component marks and the support of the crowd. Skating early in the competition, Sokolova took herself out of the running for a medal when she fell out of her Lutz and singled a loop. She finished 18th in the short.

Free skating
Arakawa, despite media pressure and being labeled an underdog, performed a five triple jump program which was enough to win the gold medal. Skating right after Cohen, Arakawa's skating was conservative but solid, no triple - triple combinations. She ended up doubling her loop jump, her nemesis jump. Skating with elegance and power, Arakawa had the highest technical and program component scores of the night.

Cohen, looking much more nervous than in the short and having her groin wrapped due to an injury, fell on her opening triple Lutz, then stepped out of the triple flip with her hand down, her next jump. Despite these early mistakes, Cohen was able to pull herself together and land the rest of her jumps and execute her trademark spins and spirals. Her only other flaw in the skate was two-footing the second jump of her triple toe - triple salchow sequence.

Slutskaya, skating last in the free like she did in 2002, was trying to become the first Russian woman to win the Olympic title. However, she came up short, doubling a flip, then falling on a triple loop. Her lower technical difficulty (only four triple jumps) and lower program component scores kept Slutskaya behind Cohen but ahead of Suguri.

Suguri had a solid skate that left her in tears and placed her fourth overall. Technically, she scored higher than Slutskaya despite having two jump combinations that were doubles, but finished behind her in program components. Rochette had one of the best skates of the night, completing six clean triples, the most of the top ladies during the free skating. Combined with strong choreography, Rochette's skate was able to move her up to fifth in the free and overall. Meissner was unable to complete her triple - triple combinations in the free and fell to sixth overall, while Hughes finished in seventh, despite a fall on the triple loop. Despite not accomplishing what American teens Tara Lipinski and Sarah Hughes did before them (winning Olympic gold), Meissner and Hughes had respectable debuts at the Olympics, and ostensibly Lipinski and the elder Hughes had already medalled at major international competitions while Meissner and the younger Hughes had not.

Meier finished eighth with a relatively clean skate but singled an Axel and doubled a Lutz jump. Kostner finished ninth overall after making major mistakes. Gedevanishvilli's program was marred by mistakes, but she was able to finish in the top ten.

Results

Short program

Free skating

Final standings

Referee:
 Yang Jiasheng

Technical Controller:
 Igor Prokop

Technical Specialist:
 Michael Slipchuk

Assistant Technical Specialist:
 Anett Pötzsch-Rauschenbach

Judges:
 Gloria Morandi
 Annette Boeren-Maas
 Diana Barbacci Levy
 Tatiana Danilenko
 Susan Lynch
 Benoit Lavoie
 Laura McNair
 Gale Tanger
 Zsofia Wagner
 Katarina Henriksson
 Yuri Kliushnikov
 Elisabeth Louesdon

References

External links
 
 Ladies' Protocol

Ladies
Oly
Women's events at the 2006 Winter Olympics